The Church of St. Mary is a Roman Catholic parish church in the Roman Catholic Archdiocese of New York, located at 438–440 Grand Street between Pitt and Attorney Streets in the Lower East Side neighborhood of Manhattan, New York City. Established in 1826 to serve Irish immigrants living in the neighborhood, it is the third oldest Catholic parish in New York. The church itself was built in 1832–33, and was then enlarged and had its facade replaced in 1871 by the prolific church architect Patrick Charles Keely. The original portion is the second oldest Roman Catholic structure in the city, after St. Patrick's Old Cathedral, which was built in 1815.

History
Before their sanctuary was built, services were held in a former Presbyterian church on Sheriff Street. Rev. Hatton Walsh was named pastor. In 1831, anti-Catholic nativists set fire to the church, but it was not completely destroyed and continued to operate. The first New York chapter of the Ancient Order of Hibernians was established in 1836 at nearby St. James Church partly in response.

In 1832 the cornerstone was laid for the present building, which was dedicated in June 1833. Rev. William J. Quarter, curate at St. Peter's on Barclay Street, was named pastor. Quarter would later become the first bishop of Chicago.

Originally designed in the Greek Revival style, the new red brick facade designed by Patrick Charles Keely in 1864 was in the Romanesque style and featured twin spires. Other changes were made by Lawrence O'Connor in 1871.

The Irish-American prelate, Rev. Michael McKenna, who had ties to Irish nationalist movement, was assistant pastor here in 1868 before becoming the first pastor of the newly separated – from St. Mary's parish – parish of St. Rose of Lima. Charles Edward McDonnell, future Bishop of Brooklyn, was assigned as curate here in the autumn of 1878.

References 
Notes

External links

Religious organizations established in 1826
Roman Catholic churches in Manhattan
Romanesque Revival church buildings in New York City
Roman Catholic churches completed in 1833
Patrick Keely buildings
Lower East Side
1826 establishments in New York (state)
19th-century Roman Catholic church buildings in the United States